Australian rapper Iggy Azalea has been featured in twenty-one music videos (including thirteen as a lead artist and five as a featured artist), one film, among various appearances in other audiovisual productions. In 2011, Azalea uploaded on YouTube her debut music video for "Pu$$y," a song from her debut mixtape, Ignorant Art, where it subsequently went viral, helping to propel the rapper to prominence, after previously sharing home videos as an underground rapper. She released two more videos from the project in following months, "My World" and "The Last Song." In 2012, she aligned herself with Southern rapper T.I.'s Grand Hustle imprint. He was then featured on "Murda Bizness," taken from her Glory EP, also appearing in the visuals, marking the beginning of multiple collaborations between the two. Around this time, Azalea made her debut appearance on American television at the 2012 BET Hip Hop Awards alongside other Grand Hustle label-mates. Azalea announced she would be releasing a second mixtape titled TrapGold by premiering a video for the track "Bac 2 Tha Future (My Time)." She was a guest performer on VH1 Divas 2012.

In 2013, Azalea signed a record deal with Virgin EMI and Def Jam, while readying the release of her debut album, The New Classic. The video for the first single, "Work," which depicts Azalea's biographical journey from life on the streets to Hollywood after she relocated from Australia to the United States to pursue a rap career, received praise from critics and was nominated for the MTV Video Music Award for Best New Artist. "Bounce," the second single, shot in Mumbai sparked discussion on the representation of Indian style and culture. The video for the third single "Change Your Life," featuring T.I., premiered later that year. Azalea also started making other television appearances and performances to promote the releases.

Azalea released "Fancy," featuring Charli XCX, in 2014, its visuals being a remake of the 1995 film Clueless, achieving success worldwide and earning her more mainstream attention, including four 2014 MTV Video Music Awards nominations and an appearance on Saturday Night Live. After the album release, the video for "Black Widow," featuring Rita Ora, premiered receiving comparisons to Quentin Tarantino's 2003 film Kill Bill, with actor Michael Madsen also starring in it, and was nominated for Best Video at the 2014 MTV Europe Music Awards. Azalea also hosted the revived House of Style series on MTV.com. She featured in singles by other artists that year, such as Ariana Grande's "Problem" and Jennifer Lopez's "Booty," appearing in the respective videos. A video for "Trouble," featuring Jennifer Hudson, from the re-release of her debut album, Reclassified, was premiered on Vevo as well. Azalea co-directed the video of her Britney Spears-collaborative single, "Pretty Girls," in 2015, marking the third time she was officially credited as a director, after her work on "Black Widow" and "Trouble" with Director X. She made her film debut in Furious 7 (2015). After that, Azalea released a series of standalone singles with accompanying music videos and an EP titled Survive the Summer in 2018.

Music videos

As a performer

As lead artist

As featured artist

Cameo appearances

Filmography

Television

Appearances as herself

As a performer

Web

Commercials

Notes

References

External links 
 
 Iggy Azalea videography at MTV.com

Videographies
Azalea, Iggy